Reference ranges (reference intervals) for blood tests are sets of values used by a health professional to interpret a set of medical test results from blood samples. Reference ranges for blood tests are studied within the field of clinical chemistry (also known as "clinical biochemistry", "chemical pathology" or "pure blood chemistry"), the area of pathology that is generally concerned with analysis of bodily fluids.

Blood test results should always be interpreted using the reference range provided by the laboratory that performed the test.

Interpretation
A reference range is usually defined as the set of values 95 percent of the normal population falls within (that is, 95% prediction interval). It is determined by collecting data from vast numbers of laboratory tests.

Plasma or whole blood
In this article, all values (except the ones listed below) denote blood plasma concentration, which is approximately 60–100% larger than the actual blood concentration if the amount inside red blood cells (RBCs) is negligible. The precise factor depends on hematocrit as well as amount inside RBCs. Exceptions are mainly those values that denote total blood concentration, and in this article they are:
 All values in Hematology – red blood cells (except hemoglobin in plasma)
 All values in Hematology – white blood cells
 Platelet count (Plt)
A few values are for inside red blood cells only:
 Vitamin B9 (folic acid/folate) in red blood cells
 Mean corpuscular hemoglobin concentration (MCHC)

Units
 Mass concentration (g/dL or g/L) is the most common measurement unit in the United States. Is usually given with dL (decilitres) as the denominator in the United States, and usually with L (litres) in, for example, Sweden.
 Molar concentration (mol/L) is used to a higher degree in most of the rest of the world, including the United Kingdom and other parts of Europe and Australia and New Zealand.
 International units (IU) are based on measured biological activity or effect, or for some substances, a specified equivalent mass.
 Enzyme activity (kat) is commonly used for e.g. liver function tests like AST, ALT, LD and γ-GT in Sweden.
 Percentages and time-dependent units (mol/s) are used for calculated derived parameters, e.g. for beta cell function in homeostasis model assessment or thyroid's secretory capacity.

Arterial or venous
If not otherwise specified, a reference range for a blood test is generally the venous range, as the standard process of obtaining a sample is by venipuncture. An exception is for acid–base and blood gases, which are generally given for arterial blood.

Still, the blood values are approximately equal between the arterial and venous sides for most substances, with the exception of acid–base, blood gases and drugs (used in therapeutic drug monitoring (TDM) assays). Arterial levels for drugs are generally higher than venous levels because of extraction while passing through tissues.

Usual or optimal
Reference ranges are usually given as what are the usual (or normal) values found in the population, more specifically the prediction interval that 95% of the population fall into. This may also be called standard range. In contrast, optimal (health) range or therapeutic target is a reference range or limit that is based on concentrations or levels that are associated with optimal health or minimal risk of related complications and diseases. For most substances presented, the optimal levels are the ones normally found in the population as well. More specifically, optimal levels are generally close to a central tendency of the values found in the population. However, usual and optimal levels may differ substantially, most notably among vitamins and blood lipids, so these tables give limits on both standard and optimal (or target) ranges. In addition, some values, including troponin I and brain natriuretic peptide, are given as the estimated appropriate cutoffs to distinguish healthy people from people with specific conditions, which here are myocardial infarction and congestive heart failure, respectively, for the aforementioned substances.

Variability

References range may vary with age, sex, race, pregnancy, diet, use of prescribed or herbal drugs and stress. Reference ranges often depend on the analytical method used, for reasons such as inaccuracy, lack of standardisation, lack of certified reference material and differing antibody reactivity. Also, reference ranges may be inaccurate when the reference groups used to establish the ranges are small.

Sorted by concentration

<div class="noprint">

By mass and molarity
Smaller, narrower boxes indicate a more tight homeostatic regulation when measured as standard "usual" reference range.

Hormones predominate at the left part of the scale, shown with a red at ng/L or pmol/L, being in very low concentration. There appears to be the greatest cluster of substances in the yellow part (μg/L or nmol/L), becoming sparser in the green part (mg/L or μmol/L). However, there is another cluster containing many metabolic substances like cholesterol and glucose at the limit with the blue part (g/L or mmol/L).

The unit conversions of substance concentrations from the molar to the mass concentration scale above are made as follows:
 Numerically:

 Measured directly in distance on the scales:
,
where distance is the direct (not logarithmic) distance in number of decades or "octaves" to the right the mass concentration is found. To translate from mass to molar concentration, the dividend (molar mass and the divisor (1000) in the division change places, or, alternatively, distance to right is changed to distance to left. Substances with a molar mass around 1000g/mol (e.g. thyroxine) are almost vertically aligned in the mass and molar images. Adrenocorticotropic hormone, on the other hand, with a molar mass of 4540, is 0.7 decades to the right in the mass image. Substances with molar mass below 1000g/mol (e.g. electrolytes and metabolites) would have "negative" distance, that is, masses deviating to the left.
Many substances given in mass concentration are not given in molar amount because they haven't been added to the article.

The diagram above can also be used as an alternative way to convert any substance concentration (not only the normal or optimal ones) from molar to mass units and vice versa for those substances appearing in both scales, by measuring how much they are horizontally displaced from one another (representing the molar mass for that substance), and using the same distance from the concentration to be converted to determine the equivalent concentration in terms of the other unit. For example, on a certain monitor, the horizontal distance between the upper limits for parathyroid hormone in pmol/L and pg/mL may be 7 cm, with the mass concentration to the right. A molar concentration of, for example, 5 pmol/L would therefore correspond to a mass concentration located 7 cm to the right in the mass diagram, that is, approximately 45 pg/mL.

By units
Units do not necessarily imply anything about molarity or mass.

A few substances are below this main interval, e.g. thyroid stimulating hormone, being measured in mU/L, or above, like rheumatoid factor and CA19-9, being measured in U/mL.

By enzyme activity

White blood cells

Sorted by category

Ions and trace metals

Included here are also related binding proteins, like ferritin and transferrin for iron, and ceruloplasmin for copper.

 Note: Although 'mEq' for mass and 'mEq/L' are sometimes used in the United States and elsewhere, they are not part of SI and are now considered redundant.

Acid–base and blood gases

If arterial/venous is not specified for an acid–base or blood gas value, then it generally refers to arterial, and not venous which otherwise is standard for other blood tests.

Acid–base and blood gases are among the few blood constituents that exhibit substantial difference between arterial and venous values. Still, pH, bicarbonate and base excess show a high level of inter-method reliability between arterial and venous tests, so arterial and venous values are roughly equivalent for these.

Liver function

Cardiac tests

Lipids

Tumour markers

Endocrinology

Thyroid hormones

Sex hormones

The diagrams below take inter-cycle and inter-woman variability into account in displaying reference ranges for estradiol, progesterone, FSH and LH.

Other hormones

Vitamins
Also including the vitamin B12)-related amino acid homocysteine.

Toxins

Hematology

Red blood cells
These values (except Hemoglobin in plasma) are for total blood and not only blood plasma.

White blood cells
These values are for total blood and not only blood plasma.

Coagulation

Immunology

Acute phase proteins
Acute phase proteins are markers of inflammation.

Isotypes of antibodies

Autoantibodies

Autoantibodies are usually absent or very low, so instead of being given in standard reference ranges, the values usually denote where they are said to be present, or whether the test is a positive test. There may also be an equivocal interval, where it is uncertain whether there is a significantly increased level.

Other immunology

Other enzymes and proteins

Other electrolytes and metabolites
Electrolytes and metabolites:
For iron and copper, some related proteins are also included.

Medication

See also
 Cardiology diagnostic tests and procedures
 Comprehensive metabolic panel
 Medical technologist
 Reference range

Notes

References

External links
 Descriptions at amarillomed.com
 Values at lymphomation.org

Further reading
 

Blood tests